Daulat Ram College is a constituent college of the University of Delhi. Founded by educationist and philanthropist Shri Daulat Ram Gupta in 1960, it is located in the North Campus. The college provides education at Bachelor's as well as Master's levels. Daulat Ram College is an all-women’s college.

Rankings
It is ranked 26th across India by National Institutional Ranking Framework in 2020.

Notable alumni
 Aishe Ghosh, Communist leader, Student activist, Jawaharlal Nehru University Students' Union President.
 Anjana Om Kashyap, Senior Journalist, Aaj Tak

References

External links

Universities and colleges in Delhi
Delhi University
1960 establishments in Delhi
Educational institutions established in 1960